AwakEVE is the 4th full album released by Japanese band Uverworld as well as the follow-up to their third album, Proglution. It was released February 18, 2009.

The album entered the Oricon charts 15 times while its peak ranking was at 2nd. It was certified gold by the Recording Industry Association of Japan.

The title is a combination of the words awake and eve.

Track listing

Personnel 
 Takuya∞ – vocals, rap, programming
 Katsuya – guitar
 Akira – guitar, programming
 Nobuto – bass guitar
 Shintarō – drums

References

External links 
 [ Awakeve review at Allmusic.com]

2009 albums
Uverworld albums
Gr8! Records albums
Japanese-language albums